The Days In Between is the eighth studio album by Blue Rodeo.

"Truscott" makes reference to Steven Truscott.

Track listing

Chart performance

Year-end charts

Certifications

References 

2000 albums
Blue Rodeo albums